Bakhuys Airstrip  is an airstrip near the village of Bakhuys and the Bakhuys Mountains (Bakhuys Gebergte) in Suriname. There is rising terrain to the south.

Charters and destinations 

Charter Airlines serving this airport are:

See also

 List of airports in Suriname
 Transport in Suriname

References 

Airports in Suriname